"Lipstick, Powder and Paint" is a song by American blues shouter Big Joe Turner, released in July 1956 as a double A-side single with "Rock a While". It was included on the soundtrack to the 1956 film Shake, Rattle & Rock!. "Lipstick, Powder and Paint" peaked at number 8 on the R&B Billboard chart, whilst the flip side "Rock a While" peaked at number 12.

Reception 
When reviewed in Billboard magazine, the single was described as a " two-faced powerhouse", as "both sides rock mightily, and feature the usual repeated refrain gimmick of which the shouter is so fond. Strong backing from vocal group and ork". Cash Box also described it as a "strong two-sider" and wrote that "Lipstick, Powder and Paint" is "a quick beat rocker intoned by that inimitable chanter. It is an infectious bouncer with several catch phrases that fall in catchy manner from that rolling tongue of Turner. A strong blues hunk of material with a very powerful lyric". "Rock a While" was described as "another hard hitting rocker done to a turn. Catchy, happy, jump wax. Deck moves with impact and excites".

Personnel 
 Joe Turner – vocals
 The Cookies – backing vocals
 Jimmy Nottingham – trumpet
 Dick Vance – trumpet
 Earle Warren – alto saxophone
 Sam Taylor – tenor saxophone
 Billy Mure – guitar
 George Barnes – guitar
 Lloyd Trotman – double bass
 Panama Francis – drums

Shakin' Stevens version 

In 1985, Welsh singer Shakin' Stevens covered the song for his album of the same name. It peaked at number 11 on the UK Singles Chart. The B-side "I'll Give You My Heart" is a remixed version of the song that had featured at the B-side to Stevens' previous single "Breaking Up My Heart".

Track listings 
7": Epic / A 6610 (UK)
 "Lipstick Powder and Paint" – 2:44
 "I'll Give You My Heart" (Remix) – 2:55

12": Epic / TA 6610 (UK)
 "Lipstick Powder and Paint" – 2:44
 "As Long As I Have You" – 3:19
 "I'll Give You My Heart" (Remix) – 2:55

Charts

Other versions 
 In 1965, British rock and roll band Kingsize Taylor and The Dominos released a cover of the song as a single in Germany.
 In 1976, American blues singer-songwriter Delbert McClinton covered the song on his album Genuine Cowhide.
 In 1985, American blues singer Tom Principato covered the song on his debut album Smokin'''.
 In 2003, American blues band Roomful of Blues covered the song on their album That's Right!''.

References 

1956 singles
1956 songs
1985 singles
1985 songs
Big Joe Turner songs
Shakin' Stevens songs
Songs written by Jesse Stone
Atlantic Records singles
Epic Records singles